Edward Fraser Rowland (November 13, 1911 – January 4, 2004) was a farmer, miner, logger and political figure in British Columbia. He represented Omineca in the Legislative Assembly of British Columbia from 1945 to 1949 as a Co-operative Commonwealth Federation (CCF) member.

He was born in Victoria, British Columbia, the son of English parents, and was educated there and in northern British Columbia. The family later moved to Rose Lake. Rowland served overseas during World War II. He was defeated when he ran for reelection in 1949. Rowland served as postmaster for Rose Lake. He later moved to Burns Lake. In 1972, Rowland was named a director for BC Hydro. He married Mary Kathleen Mould in 1933.

He died at Rose Lake in 2004.

References 

1912 births
2004 deaths
British Columbia Co-operative Commonwealth Federation MLAs
Politicians from Victoria, British Columbia
20th-century Canadian politicians